Search for the Star in a Million (formerly Star in a Million after two seasons) is a Philippine television program in ABS-CBN. The shows premise is almost the same to that of American Idol, although the format is derived from GMA's Search for a Star and ABS-CBN's Star in a Million.

Star in a Million
Star in a Million is a singing contest on ABS-CBN in the Philippines. Started in 2003, the search produced some of the country's singing talents such as Erik Santos, Frenchie Dy, Marinel Santos, Sheryn Regis, OJ Mariano and Christian Bautista. The grand champion was given a contract with Star Records and a hosting stint on ASAP Mania. The most votes a contestant had was on Season 2, when Ralph David drew 1 million votes for 4 hours.

Hosts
Ryan Agoncillo
Agot Isidro
Edu Manzano
Zsa Zsa Padilla

Judges
Dingdong Avanzado
Anna Fegi
Cherie Gil
Nanette Inventor
Gerard Salonga
Vernie Varga
Mel Villena

Contestants (season 1)
Erik Santos, Grand Champion
Sheryn Regis, 2nd Placer
Marinel Santos, 3rd Placer
Christian Bautista
Teresa Garcia
Michell San Miguel
DK Tijam
Johann Escañan
Gayle Dizon
Czarina Rosales

Results summary

Contestants (season 2)
Frenchie Dy, Grand Champion
Nyco Maca, 2nd Placer
OJ Mariano, 3rd Placer
Michael Cruz
Shanna Hife
Ralph David
Garth Garcia
Emman Omaga
Jasmine Fitzgerald

Results summary

Search for the Star in a Million
Search for the Star in a Million is a reality singing competition produced by ABS-CBN and Viva Television and being aired over ABS-CBN. This was the second project of relationship of ABS-CBN and Viva after The Sharon Cuneta Show. The second season is now finished and had Kris Lawrence as its Grand Champion.

Hosts
 Erik Santos 
 Mark Bautista
 Sarah Geronimo (Season 1 only)
 Christian Bautista (Season 1 only)
 Rachelle Ann Go (Season 2 only and recent guest host during Season 1)
 Sheryn Regis (Season 2 only)

Judges
 Agot Isidro
 Rowell Santiago
 Wyngard Tracy

Contestants (season 1)
Jerome Sala, Grand Champion
Nikki Bacolod, 2nd Placer
Mabel Bacusmo, 3rd Placer
Jona Lumbera, 4th Placer
Ryan Racal, 5th Placer
Myke Caluma
Jorell Canuel
Dianafe Castillo
Christine Fernandez
Billy Joel Bartolome
Hans Lee
Veejay Aragon

Results summary

Contestants (season 2)
Kris Lawrence, Grand Champion
Tata Villaruel, 2nd Placer
Jimmy Marquez, 3rd Placer
Vino Bello, 4th Placer
Lance Oñate, 5th Placer
Jay Perillo
Ais Roxas
Tony dela Paz
Shake Valerio
Francis Ong
Joey Ignacio
Anna Baluyot

Results summary

External links
Erik Santos - Prince of Pop Fansite

See also
List of programs broadcast by ABS-CBN
Born Diva
Little Big Star
Little Big Superstar
Tawag ng Tanghalan

ABS-CBN original programming
Philippine reality television series
2003 Philippine television series debuts
2006 Philippine television series endings
Filipino-language television shows
Television series by Viva Television